Angelique Olivier (born 12 June 1975) is a former tennis player from France. 

During her professional career from 1991–1995, she won two titles on the ITF Women's Circuit. Olivier received a wild-card entry into the French Open in 1992, 1993 and 1994. On the WTA Tour, she also received a wild-card entry into the 1994 Open Gaz de France tournament and reached the main draw of the 1994 Australian Tasmanian International as a qualifier.

Career
On 1 February 1993, Olivier reached her highest singles ranking of world number 151. Her highest doubles ranking came on 8 August 1994, when she became world number 210.

In Portugal on 10 February 1992, Olivier defeated compatriot Axelle Thomas to win the singles title at the $10k Carvoeiro tournament. On 5 December 1994, she partnered with Elena Wagner to win the doubles title at the $50k Cergy-Pontois tournament in France.

ITF finals

Singles (1–4)

Doubles (1–3)

References

External links
 
 

1975 births
Living people
French female tennis players
20th-century French women